Plasnica is a municipality in western North Macedonia. Plasnica is also the name of the village where the municipal seat is found. Plasnica Municipality is part of the Southwestern Statistical Region. It is particularly noteworthy in having a mostly ethnic Turkish population.

Geography
The municipality borders Makedonski Brod Municipality to the northeast, Kruševo Municipality to the southeast, Kičevo Municipality to the southwest, west and northwest.

Demographics 
According to the last national census from 2021, this municipality has 4,222 inhabitants.

See also 
Turks in North Macedonia
Torbeš people
Turkification

References

External links
 Official website

 
Southwestern Statistical Region
Municipalities of North Macedonia